The 1991 World Junior Figure Skating Championships were held from November 27 to December 2, 1990 in Budapest, Hungary. The event was sanctioned by the International Skating Union and open to ISU member nations. Medals were awarded in the disciplines of men's singles, ladies' singles, pair skating, and ice dancing.

Medal table

Competition notes
Due to the large number of participants, the men and ladies had to qualify to participate in short program and free skating. Reunified in 1990, Germany had a special arrangement in number of participants based on the results of West Germany and East Germany in 1990.

Results

Men

Ladies

Pairs

Ice dancing

References

 German figure skating magazin “Pirouette” 25th year's issues, January 1991, No. 1

World Junior Figure Skating Championships
1990 in figure skating
World Junior Figure Skating Championships, 1991
F
International figure skating competitions hosted by Hungary